The Derelicts were a London-based "[activist] R&B band" active from 1974–1976, well known on the London pub rock/squat rock circuit, consisting of Susan Gogan, lead vox/artwork; Richard Williams, drums; Barbara Gogan, guitar/backing vox; Marion Fudger, bass; and John Studholme, guitar; Debby Moss, violin; John Harris, bass; Alan Lofting, who was shy and would play facing the back of the stage, guitar; Sue Allegra, vox/backing vox; Dan Kelleher, ex 101-ers, bass.

The band was started when Sue Allegra, who was working at the Fender Soundhouse, phoned Barbara one day and told her: "Find thirty quid. I'm sending a man over with a Les Paul copy and an AC30 amp, and you're going to buy them." Then Richard went to Bristol and got his drums out of storage. A couple of weeks later, they played their first show upstairs in a pub in northwest London. The line-up was: Sue Gogan, Barbara Gogan, Richard Williams, Sue Allegra, John Harris, Alan Lofting and Debby Moss.

When the band split up, some of the former members went on to start two other bands - Barbara Gogan and Williams joined the not-yet-named The Passions, formed by songwriter and bassist Claire Bidwell, and Susan Gogan and Studholme formed pragVEC. Bass guitarist Marion Fudger went on to join The Art Attacks.

References

External links
 International Times Feb 1977 P.28 Photo of The Derelicts performing.
 Derelicts poster

English rock music groups
Protopunk groups